At least two ships of the Argentine Navy have been named Almirante Storni:

 , a  launched in 1943 as USS Cowell acquired in 1971 and scrapped in 1982
 , a  launched in 2021

Argentine Navy ship names